"Las Palabras de Amor (The Words of Love)" is a rock ballad by the British rock band Queen. It was released as the third single from their 1982 album Hot Space. It is sung mostly in English, but with several Spanish phrases. Written by guitarist Brian May, the song proved more popular in the United Kingdom than their previous single ("Body Language"), reaching No. 17 in the UK Singles Chart.

Despite the mixed response to its parent album, "Las Palabras de Amor" has become a fan favourite.

Background
The song's lyrics were written by guitarist Brian May. Vocals were provided by lead singer Freddie Mercury with May on the high harmony vocal. The song was inspired by the band's close relationship with their Argentinian fans. It marked the band's final studio appearance on Top of the Pops (having previously appeared to promote "Seven Seas of Rhye", "Killer Queen", "Now I'm Here" and "Good Old-Fashioned Lover Boy" respectively). For this mimed performance May is seen playing a grand piano as well as his guitar and, on the recording, he plays both piano and synths in addition to acoustic and electric guitars. May also sang lead vocals for the harmonized line "this night and evermore" throughout the song.

During the Freddie Mercury Tribute Concert at Wembley Stadium in 1992, this was the third song of the second half, performed by Zucchero and Queen. In Queen + Paul Rodgers Rock The Cosmos-tour 2008 it was played in the Spanish speaking countries, sung by May.

This song also made it onto 1999 Queen's Greatest Hits III and, more recently, on the Queen Forever compilation. It also appears on the Greatest Video Hits 2 DVD released in November 2003.

Musical theatre actress Elaine Paige recorded the song on her album of Queen covers The Queen Album in 1988.

The baby's face image of the single's cover would reappear on The Cross single for their song "New Dark Ages".

Personnel
Queen 
Freddie Mercury – lead and backing vocals
Brian May – electric and 12-string acoustic guitars, keyboards, backing vocals
Roger Taylor – drums, backing vocals
John Deacon – bass

Charts

References

External links
 Official YouTube videos: original music video, at Freddie Mercury Tribute Concert (with Zucchero)
 Lyrics at Queen official website: album version, version from Greatest Hits III

Queen (band) songs
1982 singles
Songs written by Brian May
1980s ballads
Macaronic songs
Rock ballads
Song recordings produced by Reinhold Mack
EMI Records singles
Hollywood Records singles
1982 songs